John Frederick William Birney (known as Ewan Birney)  (born 6 December 1972) is joint director of EMBL's European Bioinformatics Institute (EMBL-EBI), in Hinxton, Cambridgeshire and deputy director general of the European Molecular Biology Laboratory (EMBL). He also serves as non-executive director of Genomics England, chair of the Global Alliance for Genomics and Health (GA4GH) and honorary professor of bioinformatics at the University of Cambridge. Birney has made significant contributions to genomics, through his development of innovative bioinformatics and computational biology tools. He previously served as an associate faculty member at the Wellcome Trust Sanger Institute.

Education
Birney was educated at Eton College as an Oppidan Scholar. Before going to university, Birney completed a gap year internship at Cold Spring Harbor Laboratory supervised by James Watson and Adrian Krainer.

Birney completed his Bachelor of Arts degree in Biochemistry at the University of Oxford in 1996, where he was an undergraduate student at Balliol College, Oxford. He completed his PhD at the Sanger Institute, supervised by Richard Durbin while he was a postgraduate student at St John's College, Cambridge. His doctoral research used dynamic programming, finite-state machines and probabilistic automatons for sequence alignment.

While he was a student he completed internships in the office of the Mayor of Baltimore and also in financial services on valuation of options for the Swiss Bank Corporation.

Research and career
From 2000 to 2003, Birney organised a scientific wager and sweepstake known as GeneSweep, for the genomics community, taking bets on estimates of the total number of genes (and noncoding DNA) in the human genome.

Birney is one of the founders of the Ensembl genome browser and other databases, and has played a role in the sequencing of the Human Genome in 2000 and the analysis of genome function in the ENCODE project. He has played a role in annotating the genome sequences of the human, mouse, chicken and several other organisms. His research group focuses on computational genomics and inter-individual differences in human and other animals.

Birney is known for his role in the ENCODE consortium. Prior to the ENCODE project, Birney has been involved in creation of a number of widely used bioinformatics and computational biology tools, either directly (PairWise, GeneWise, GenomeWise,), or in collaboration with students and postdocs, e.g.  Exonerate (with Guy Slater), Enredo (Javier Herrero), Pecan (Benedict Paten), the Velvet assembler (Daniel Zerbino
) and CRAM (Markus Hsi-Yang Fritz, Rasko Leinonen and Vadim Zalunin). Birney has also contributed to several other projects including the Pfam database, InterPro, BioPerl, and HMMER and Ensembl genome database project.

, Birney's research group focuses on genomic algorithms and studying inter individual differences, in both human and other species. He has supervised several PhD students and postdoctoral researchers that have worked in his laboratory. His research has been funded by the Biotechnology and Biological Sciences Research Council (BBSRC), Medical Research Council (MRC) the National Human Genome Research Institute (NHGRI), the Wellcome Trust and the European Union.

Birney serves as a consultant to Oxford Nanopore Technologies and on the scientific advisory board of the Earlham Institute (formerly TGAC) in Norwich. Since 2022, he has served on the governing board at Eton College.

Awards and honours
In 2002, Birney was named as one of the MIT Technology Review TR100 top 100 innovators in the world under the age of 35. In 2003, he gave the inaugural Francis Crick Lecture at the Royal Society: In 2005, he was awarded the Overton Prize by the International Society for Computational Biology (ISCB) for his advocacy of open source bioinformatics, contributions to the BioPerl community and leadership of the Ensembl genome annotation project. In 2005 Birney was awarded the Benjamin Franklin Award in Bioinformatics:

Birney was awarded membership of the European Molecular Biology Organization (EMBO) in 2012 and elected a Fellow of the Royal Society (FRS) in 2014. His certificate of election and candidature reads:

Birney has been awarded an Honorary Doctor of Science (DSc) degrees: in 2014 from Brunel University London and in 2021 from University of Tartu, Estonia. In 2015, Birney was elected a Fellow of the Academy of Medical Sciences (FMedSci). Birney was appointed Commander of the Order of the British Empire (CBE) in the 2019 New Year Honours.

Personal life
Birney married in 2003 and has two children.

References

|-

Living people
Members of the European Molecular Biology Organization
People educated at Eton College
Alumni of Balliol College, Oxford
Alumni of St John's College, Cambridge
British bioinformaticians
Commanders of the Order of the British Empire
Overton Prize winners
Fellows of Churchill College, Cambridge
Wellcome Trust
1972 births
Fellows of the Royal Society
Fellows of the International Society for Computational Biology
Fellows of the Academy of Medical Sciences (United Kingdom)
Human Genome Project scientists